The Comstock-Harris House, also known as Eastbank, is a historic home in Winter Park, Florida. It is located at 724 Bonita Drive. It was added to the National Register of Historic Places on January 13, 1983. It is the oldest surviving home in Winter Park.

History
A small home was built on the site of the present house in 1878. In 1883, William C. Comstock, a Chicago businessman, finished construction into its current incarnation, that of a large Queen Anne style estate. The Comstock-Harris House, also known as Eastbank, is the oldest surviving home in Winter Park. It is situated on the east bank of Lake Osceola.

Originally a winter cottage, it consists of three floors and three stairways. The main staircase turns in front of a stained glass window. Red bricks make up the foundation of the house as well as the six interior fireplaces. The original color of the house was yellow with dark green trim. Before the grounds were subdivided, they consisted of sixty acres. Camphor trees lined the long drive that led to the house, which is now Bonita Drive.

Comstock died in 1924. The house was then sold to a Mr. Lasbury and then sold again in 1928 to John Harris. It has remained in the family since then.

References

External links

 Orange County listings at National Register of Historic Places
 Orange County listings at Florida's Office of Cultural and Historical Programs
 Comstock-Harris House at the Winter Park Public Library "History for kids"

Houses on the National Register of Historic Places in Florida
National Register of Historic Places in Orange County, Florida
Buildings and structures in Winter Park, Florida
Houses in Orange County, Florida
Queen Anne architecture in Florida
Houses completed in 1878
1878 establishments in Florida